Salt Creek is a tributary of the Little Wabash River, which it joins near Edgewood, Illinois, near the boundary between Effingham and Clay counties. There are at least two other "Salt Creeks" in Illinois: Salt Creek (Des Plaines River tributary) and Salt Creek (Sangamon River tributary).

Cities, towns and counties
Salt Creek drains the following cities, towns and villages:
Effingham
T-town
Watson

Salt Creek drains parts of the following Illinois counties:
Cumberland County
Effingham County

See also
List of Illinois rivers

References

External links
Prairie Rivers Network
TopoQuest, Salt Creek meets the Little Wabash

Rivers of Illinois
Tributaries of the Wabash River
Rivers of Effingham County, Illinois
Rivers of Cumberland County, Illinois